Suzanne Al Houby, a Palestinian mountain climber, was the first Arab woman to climb Mount Everest on May 21, 2011 and the seven summits.

Previously, she was also the first Arab woman to climb many other mountains: Mont Blanc, Elbrus, Aconcagua, Vinson, Denali, Carstensz Pyramid and many others.

Originally, Suzanne's family comes from Jaffa, Palestine, she got her higher education in the United States and lived most of her life in the United Arab Emirates. She is the founder and CEO of the adventure travel company Rahhalah.

In January 2014, Suzanne led the first two Arab amputees up to the summit of Kilimanjaro on a Climb of Hope project aimed at raising both awareness and funds to treating sick children in conflict areas in affiliation with Palestine Children Relief Fund PCRF www.pcrf.net. Mutassem Abu Karsh and Yasmeen Najjar - both with prosthetic legs - became the first Arab amputees to reach the summit of Kilimanjaro.

References

External links
  

Living people
Summiters of Mount Everest
Palestinian sportswomen
Female climbers
Year of birth missing (living people)
Palestinian mountain climbers